The Varvarin bridge bombing was an aerial bombing executed by NATO as part of the Operation Allied Force. Ten people were killed and 17 were severely injured, all of them civilians.

Events 

On 30 May 1999, as part of the NATO bombing of Yugoslavia, the NATO bombed a bridge crossing the Velika Morava river in Varvarin. It was Sunday and the streets were full of people going to the market or coming back from the Orthodox church service for the Holy Trinity that had just finished. Soon after noon, two low-flying NATO F-16 warplanes fired the first laser-guided bomb strike against the bridge, killing three people and severely injuring five more. A few minutes after the first strike, as people rushed to the bridge to help the injured, two more bombs were fired. In total, 10 people were killed and 17 were severely injured.

The 10 fatal victims were Sanja Milenković (15), Milan Savić (28), Vojkan Stanković (30), Zoran Marinković (33), Stojan Ristić (52), Ratibor Simonović (24), Ružica Simonović (55), Milivoje Ćirić (66), Dragoslav Terzić (67) and Tola Apostolović (74).

The nationality of the pilots is unknown and the military purpose of the operation remains unclear.

Reactions 

NATO spokesperson Jamie Shea declared that the bridge was a military target. Locals said that the bridge was too narrow for tanks and it was attacked on a clear day instead of during the night, accusing NATO of deliberately killing civilians.

Legal actions 
In 2003, families of the victims sued the German government in Germany. The claimants argued that Germany gave assistance to NATO air operations and claimed compensations. German courts dismissed the right of the families to seek compensations in Germany. First in the regional court of Bonn in 2003, then in the higher regional court of Cologne in 2005 and the Federal Court of Justice in 2006. The families filed a complaint to the Federal Constitutional Court in 2007 seeking to reverse previous court decisions. On 13 August 2013, Federal Constitutional Court dismissed the claims again, arguing that victims of military operations abroad did not have the right for individual compensations.

See also 
 Civilian casualties during Operation Allied Force
 Grdelica train bombing
Lužane bus bombing
Koriša bombing
NATO bombing of Albanian refugees near Gjakova

References 

1999 in Serbia
May 1999 events in Europe
Aerial operations and battles of the Kosovo War
Civilian casualties in the Kosovo War
NATO airstrikes
Incidents involving NATO
United States war crimes